Minot is generally divided into three areas: North Hill, the Souris River Valley and South Hill.  The following list shows neighborhoods within these subdivisions.

North Hill

 Davis Addition
 Northern Lights Addition
 University Heights

The Valley 

 Bel Air
 Downtown
 Eastwood Park
 Minot State University
 Oak Park
 Parkland
 Spring Lake
 Torbenson
 West Minot
 West Oaks

South Hill

  Anthony Hill
  Boston Heights
  Charlesbois
  Dakota Square Mall
  Southwest Minot
  Summit Park
  Upper Brooklyn
  Warrendale
  Woodridge

References

Minot